Bruno Apitz (28 April 1900 – 7 April 1979) was a German writer and a survivor of the Buchenwald concentration camp.

Life and career
Apitz was born in Leipzig, as the twelfth child of a washer woman. He attended school until he was fourteen, then started apprenticeship as a die cutter. During World War I, he was a passionate supporter of German Communist Party leader Karl Liebknecht. At 17, he made a speech in front of striking factory workers that resulted in his being sentenced to nineteen months in prison. In 1919, he joined the Social Democratic Party of Germany (SPD) and in 1927, the more radical Communist Party of Germany (KPD). He took active part in the German November Revolution of 1918 and in opposition to the Kapp Putsch of 1920. During the latter he published his first poems and short stories in Communist newspapers. He wrote his first play in 1924 and was later repeatedly imprisoned under Nazi rule in various concentration camps for spreading socialistic anti-war propaganda and being an active member of the Communist Party. From 1937 to 1945 he was an inmate of the Buchenwald concentration camp near Weimar. It was this imprisonment that would later become the basis for his most famous novel, Nackt unter Wölfen (Naked among Wolves).

After 1945, he worked for the East German state film company DEFA and as a radio play author. He was one of the founding members of the Socialist Unity Party of Germany (SED), which became the dominant party in the German Democratic Republic (East Germany). In the early 1950s, Apitz worked as a guide to the former camp, Buchenwald, and was "actively involved in the plan for the earliest expedition to be shown there in 1952." He was a member of the Academy of Arts and the PEN-Clubs of the GDR.

Apitz's best selling novel Nackt unter Wölfen was first published in 1958 and then translated into over thirty languages, winning him worldwide recognition. The English translation, the only Apitz novel to have been translated into English, was by Edith Anderson and published by Seven Seas Books in 1967. The logline for this edition reads as follows: "Armies drive before them the rags of Hitler's might and news trickles through to the concentration camp inmates and a child is saved."

Bruno Apitz's home town, Leipzig, named him a Citizen of Honour in 1976. He died on 17 April 1979 in Berlin.

Books
 Der Mensch im Nacken, 1924
 Nackt unter Wölfen, 1958; English translation, Naked among Wolves, 1967
 Esther, 1959
 Der Regenbogen, 1976
 Schwelbrand. Autobiografischer Roman, Berlin 1984

References

1900 births
1979 deaths
People from the Kingdom of Saxony
Social Democratic Party of Germany politicians
Communist Party of Germany members
Socialist Unity Party of Germany members
German male short story writers
German short story writers
German radio writers
East German writers
20th-century German novelists
20th-century German dramatists and playwrights
German male novelists
German male dramatists and playwrights
20th-century German short story writers
Communists in the German Resistance
Buchenwald concentration camp survivors
Recipients of the Patriotic Order of Merit (honor clasp)
Recipients of the National Prize of East Germany
Writers from Leipzig